The 1966–67 Austrian Hockey League season was the 37th season of the Austrian Hockey League, the top level of ice hockey in Austria. Five teams participated in the league, and EC KAC won the championship.

Regular season

External links
Austrian Ice Hockey Association

Austrian Hockey League seasons
Aus
1966–67 in Austrian ice hockey